Rubbing (friction) is moving an object in contact with another object using pressure and friction

Rub or RUB may also refer to:

Organisations
 Ruhr-Universität Bochum
 Royal University of Bhutan, the national university system of Bhutan

Food
 Spice rub, in cooking
 Rub (syrup), a kind of syrup extracted from dates

Arts and entertainment
 Rub (album), by Peaches
 Rubbing, an art technique
 The Rub, an English rock band

People
 Kurt Rub (born 1946), Swiss former racing cyclist
 Timothy Rub (born 1952), American museum director and art historian

Other uses
 Russian ruble (ISO 4217 currency code), the currency of the Russian Federation
 Christian Rub (1886–1956), character actor from Germany
 Kuliak languages, in Uganda
 Liniment, a medicated topical preparation for application to the skin, sometimes heat rubs
 Massage, to work and act on the body with pressure
 Rub (professional wrestling), a wrestling technique

See also
 Ratio Utility Billing Systems (RUBS), a utility billing allocation method